is a Japanese former professional footballer who played as a goalkeeper. Born in the Netherlands, Havenaar is a naturalized Japanese citizen. His sons Mike and Nikki are also footballers.

Playing career
Havenaar was born in Hazerswoude-Dorp, Netherlands, on 26 September 1957. In 1979, he joined Den Haag. He played in 80 matches for the club. In 1986, he moved to Japan and joined Japan Soccer League club Mazda and coach Hans Ooft. He was elected to the Best Eleven in the 1986–87 season and the club was runner-up in the 1987 Emperor's Cup. The club was relegated to Division 2 in 1988. In 1989, he moved to Yomiuri. He hardly played due to injury. He retired and became a goalkeeper coach at Toyota Motors (later Nagoya Grampus Eight) in 1991.

In 1992, the Japan Soccer League was folded and the J1 League was formed. Havenaar returned as a player for Nagoya Grampus Eight. He played many matches while battling with Yuji Ito for the #1 shirt. In January 1994, his family became naturalized Japanese citizens. In 1995, he moved to Júbilo Iwata and played regularly. In 1997, he moved to Japan Football League club Consadole Sapporo. He played as the #1 goalkeeper and the club won the J2 League title in 1997, resulting in promotion to the J1 League. He retired at the end of the 1998 season, at the age of 41.

Coaching career
In 1991, Havenaar retired from playing and became a goalkeeper coach for Toyota Motors (later Nagoya Grampus). In 1992, he returned as a player. In 1993, he also served as goalkeeper coach for the Japan national team for 1994 World Cup qualification under manager Hans Ooft who was coach when Havenaar played for Mazda. In 1995, he moved to Júbilo Iwata and became a playing goalkeeper coach. He left the club at the end of the 1996 season.

Havenaar retired from playing at Consadole Sapporo after the end of the 1998 season and became goalkeeper coach at Consadole under manager Takeshi Okada in 1999. He coached the club until 2002. In 2003, he moved to Yokohama F. Marinos and became a goalkeeper coach under manager Okada again. The club won the 2003 and 2004 J1 titles. He coached the club until 2006. In 2008, he returned to Nagoya Grampus and became an assistant coach. In September 2011, he moved to Shimizu S-Pulse and became a coach as goalkeeper coach Masanori Sanada's successor. In 2013, he moved to South Korea and became a goalkeeper coach for Suwon Samsung Bluewings. He coached the club until 2014.

Career statistics

References

External links

Yokohama F. Marinos profile 
Shimizu S-Pulse profile 
ADO Statistics

1957 births
Living people
People from Hazerswoude
Dutch footballers
Japanese footballers
Japan Soccer League players
J1 League players
Japan Football League (1992–1998) players
ADO Den Haag players
Sanfrecce Hiroshima players
Tokyo Verdy players
Nagoya Grampus players
Júbilo Iwata players
Hokkaido Consadole Sapporo players
Dutch expatriate footballers
Dutch expatriate sportspeople in Japan
Dutch expatriate sportspeople in South Korea
Expatriate footballers in Japan
Japanese expatriate sportspeople in South Korea
Naturalized citizens of Japan
Association football goalkeepers
Dutch expatriate football managers
Footballers from South Holland